Holy Cross Catholic Secondary School is a Catholic secondary school in Strathroy, Ontario, administered by the London District Catholic School Board.

History
Holy Cross Catholic Secondary school opened its doors in 2002. It was the first Catholic Secondary School in Western Middlesex County. It started off with a population of 126 students, and with Grades 9s and 10s. Each year after, a new grade was added on. The school had its first graduating class in 2005. The school is a unique one, as it shares facilities with another school, S.D.C.I (Strathroy District Collegiate Institute), which is part of the TVDSB. Both schools also share a complex with the town of Strathroy.

See also
List of high schools in Ontario

References

External links
 Holy Cross Homepage
 London District Catholic School Board Homepage- Homepage of the LDCSB

Strathroy-Caradoc
High schools in Middlesex County, Ontario
Catholic Church in Ontario
Educational institutions established in 2002
2002 establishments in Ontario